36 Corps, 36th Corps, Thirty Sixth Corps, or XXXVI Corps may refer to:

 36th Army Corps (France)
 XXXVI Mountain Corps (Wehrmacht), Germany
 36th Army Corps (Russian Empire)
 XXXVI Corps (United States)

See also
List of military corps by number
 36th Army (disambiguation)
 36th Brigade (disambiguation)
 36th Division (disambiguation)
 36 Squadron (disambiguation)